James Abercromby, 1st Baron Dunfermline FRSE  (7 November 177617 April 1858), was a British barrister and Whig politician. He served as Speaker of the House of Commons between 1835 and 1839.

Background and education
Abercromby was the third son of General Sir Ralph Abercromby, who fell at the Battle of Alexandria, and Mary, 1st Baroness Abercromby, daughter of John Menzies of Fernton, Perthshire. He was the younger brother of George Abercromby, 2nd Baron Abercromby and Sir John Abercromby and the elder brother of Alexander Abercromby. He attended the Royal High School, Edinburgh, and was called to the English Bar, Lincoln's Inn, in 1801. He became a commissioner of bankruptcy and later appointed steward of the Duke of Devonshire's estates.

Legal and political career
Abercromby sat as Whig Member of Parliament for Midhurst between 1807 and 1812 and for Calne between 1812 and 1830. He brought forwards two motions for bills to change the representation for Edinburgh in parliament. He received great support but no change was made until the Reform Act 1832. In 1827 he was sworn of the Privy Council and appointed Judge-Advocate-General by George Canning, a post he held until 1828, the last months under the premiership of Lord Goderich.

In 1830 Abercromby was made Lord Chief Baron of the Court of Exchequer in Scotland, a position he retained until 1832, when the office was abolished. He received a pension of £2,000 a year. 

In 1831 he was elected a Fellow of the Royal Society of Edinburgh his proposer being John Hope, Lord Hope.

In 1832 returned to the House of Commons as one of two members for Edinburgh, whose representation had now been increased from one to two members. In July 1834 he entered Lord Melbourne's cabinet as Master of the Mint, but only held the post until November of the same year, when the Whigs lost power.

Abercromby was considered for the speakership of the House of Commons by his party for the 1833 election, but Edward Littleton was eventually chosen instead (he was defeated by Charles Manners-Sutton). However, in the 1835 election he was chosen as the Whig candidate. Due to an evenly balanced House of Commons the election rendered great interest and was fiercely contested. On 19 February 1835 Abercromby was elected, defeating Manners-Sutton by 316 votes to 306. The Dictionary of National Biography writes that "As speaker Abercromby acted with great impartiality while he possessed sufficient decision to quell any serious tendency to disorder." During his tenure a number of reforms for the introduction of private bills were made. In spite of failing health Abercromby continued as speaker until 1839. On his retirement he was raised to the peerage as Baron Dunfermline, of Dunfermline in the County of Fife.

After his retirement Abercromby continued to take an interest in public affairs, specifically those involving the city of Edinburgh. He was one of the originators of the United Industrial School for the support and training of destitute children. In 1841 he was elected as Dean of Faculty at the University of Glasgow. He also wrote a biography of his father, published posthumously in 1861.

He died at Colinton House, just south-west of Edinburgh on 17 April 1858.

Family

Lord Dunfermline married Mary Anne, daughter of Egerton Leigh, of West Hall, in High Legh, on 14 June 1802. He bought property and land in Colinton, Midlothian in 1840. 

He died at Colinton House, on the south-west edge of Edinburgh in April 1858, aged 81, and 
was buried at Grange Cemetery, Edinburgh. He was succeeded in the barony by his son, Sir Ralph Abercromby, KCB, who was Secretary of Legation at Berlin and served as Envoy Extraordinary and Minister Plenipotentiary to Sardinia between 1840 and 1851 and to The Hague between 1851 and 1858. Lady Dunfermline died in August 1874.

He was the nephew of Robert Bruce, Lord Kennet.

A portrait of James Abercromby as a child by David Allan (1779) is held by the University of Dundee Museum Services

Arms

References

Burke, John, History of the Commoners of Great Britain and Ireland, vol.iii, London, 1838, pp. 1–2.
Anderson, William, The Scottish Nation, Edinburgh, 1867, vol.iv, p. 105.

External links 
 

1776 births
1858 deaths
Abercromby, James
People educated at the Royal High School, Edinburgh
English barristers
James
Whig (British political party) MPs for Scottish constituencies
Barons of the Court of Exchequer (Scotland)
Masters of the Mint
Barons Dunfermline
Abercromby, James
Abercromby, James
Abercromby, James
Abercromby, James
Abercromby, James
Abercromby, James
Abercromby, James
Abercromby, James
Abercromby, James
Abercromby, James
UK MPs who were granted peerages
Speakers of the House of Commons of the United Kingdom
Fellows of the Royal Society of Edinburgh
Burials at the Grange Cemetery
Members of the Privy Council of the United Kingdom
Peers of the United Kingdom created by Queen Victoria
Committee members of the Society for the Diffusion of Useful Knowledge